The 2011 Bowling Green Falcons football team represented Bowling Green State University in the 2011 NCAA Division I FBS football season. The Falcons were led by third year head coach Dave Clawson and played their home games at Doyt Perry Stadium. They are a member of the East Division of the Mid-American Conference. They finished the season 5–7, 3–5 in MAC play to finish in a tie for fourth place in the East Division.

Schedule

References

Bowling Green
Bowling Green Falcons football seasons
Bowling Green Falcons football